is a platform video game by Sega, which was released in 1988 for the Sega Mega Drive. An early Mega Drive title, it never saw a release outside of Japan. The game was based on the manga Osomatsu-kun by Fujio Akatsuka, and acts as a promotion for the anime adaptation that premiered the same year; players controlled the title character and encountered many of the series' characters in a strange (but comical) world.

Gameplay

The player controls Osomatsu, leader of the sextuplets, through a total of three stages, armed only with a short-range slingshot. Each stage has a distinct path the players need to follow in order to proceed, though each stage has a variety of different places to go. Each stage is divided into a number of separate segments, with Osomatsu traversing between them via a variety of ways, such as going through doors, falling down pits, grabbing balloons, or jumping on a golden cloud. In order to fight the boss of each stage, the player has to locate and defeat the stage's miniboss, portrayed by either Chibita or Dekapan, in order to locate and defeat Iyami, who plays the role of the stage's boss. Every time a boss or miniboss is defeated, Osomatsu's maximum health and slingshot range both increase.

The player can enter shops run by Totoko, where they can purchase power-ups using collectible yellow ribbons; the player's inventory is located on the pause screen. The shops also have mini-games, such as a slot machine and a small path-finding game. The player starts each game with three lives and cannot earn any continues; additional lives are awarded by collecting six 1-Up Cards. Defeating enemies can cause them to randomly drop ribbons, health items, or (on rare occasions) 1-Up Cards.

Items

Normal
Ribbons: Currency needed to gamble or buy items from Totoko's shop
Ramune: Increases Osomatsu's health slightly
Cupcake: Increases Osomatsu's health moderately
Chocolate Bar: Increases Osomatu's health greatly
Ramen: Increases Osomatsu's health even more
Totoko Doll: Completely restores Osomatsu's health 
1up Card (bearing Osomatsu's face): collecting six gives a player an extra life

Special
Wings: Allow Osomatsu to fly for a short time, but disables his ability to attack
Octopus: Allows Osomatsu to run faster
Fireworks: Damage any enemies nearby
Monk's Robe: Makes Osomatsu temporarily invincible
Karashi: Destroys all small enemies on the screen
Bone Fish: Summons a small cat to help defeat nearby enemies

Reception 

The game was poorly received due to the maze-esque level design, frustrating controls and short length. Despite this, it got a cult following as a game so bad that it's good.

References

1988 video games
Japan-exclusive video games
Osomatsu-kun
Platform games
Sega video games
Sega Genesis games
Sega Genesis-only games
Video games based on anime and manga
Video games set in Japan
Video games developed in Japan
Single-player video games